Mulavar or Mula-murti is a Sanskrit-Tamil term referring to the main deity, or a murti (cult image) in a Hindu temple.

Location
The central deity, mulavar, is located near the centre of temples, than the images that surround them, and are precisely located at the points corresponding to the energies they represent on the temple plan's mythical power diagram. During the Kumbabhishekam or the coronation event, the temple is renovated, while the mulavar image is moved to a temporary location. The practice is called Balalayam, during which a temporary image is housed in the sanctum.

Sanctum 
Garbhagriha (lit. womb chamber) is a Sanskrit word referring to the interior of the sanctum sanctorum, the innermost sanctum of a Hindu temple, where resides the murti (idol or icon) of the primary deity of the temple. The sanctum is located at the centre of the temple, and its only opening mostly faces east. Only the pujari (priests) are allowed to enter the sanctum. The mulavar is usually made of stone images in most South Indian temples. In some temples, it is made of limestone or wood. In Shiva temples, the mulavar vigraha is usually a lingam (an iconic form), while in all other temples, the sculpted image of the respective deities are sported with their weapons in different positions based on the legend associated with the temple. In large temples, more than one image is housed inside the sanctum.

Religious practices
The temple priests perform the puja (prayer rituals) during festivals and on a daily basis. The temple rituals are performed five times a day; Ushathkalam at 6:00 a.m., Kalasanthi at 9:00 a.m., Uchikalam at 1:00 p.m., Sayarakshai at 5:00 p.m., and Ardha Jamam at 9:00 p.m. Each ritual comprises four steps: abhisheka (sacred bath), alangaram (decoration), neivethanam (food offering), and deepa aradanai (waving of lamps) for the presiding deities in the temple. The worship is held amidst music with nadaswaram (a pipe instrument) and tavil (percussion instrument), religious instructions in the Vedas (sacred text) read by priests, and prostration by worshippers in front of the temple mast. The ablution on the mulavar deity is performed in a sequence with various material like milk, curd, honey, and sugar. These are meant to indicate five elemental aspects of earth and with the ablution, prayers are sought to please the five natural elements.

References

External links

Hindu temple architecture
Sanskrit words and phrases
Hindu iconography